Södra Vi is a locality situated in Vimmerby Municipality, Kalmar County, Sweden with 1,182 inhabitants in 2010. According to Svenskt ortnamnslexikon the name of the locality loosely mean "southern place of worship". Tens of kilometers to the northwest lies Norra Vi.

References

External links 

Populated places in Kalmar County
Populated places in Vimmerby Municipality